David Burt (1953) is a British actor, known primarily for his many and wide-ranging West End performances.

David Burt is the son of Pip Hinton, better known for her role in Crackerjack alongside Eamonn Andrews and later Leslie Crowther.  He graduated from RADA.

His West End theatre work includes Jesus Christ Superstar, Chess, Les Misérables and Cats. He has also played many leading roles at the Royal National Theatre and the Royal Shakespeare Company. His television work includes The Trojan Horse, Poldark and The Merchant of Venice.

Burt played the flamboyant Count Fosco opposite Yvette Robinson in Andrew Lloyd Webber's The Woman in White at the Palace Theatre (2005) and was featured as Captain Andy Hawks in Show Boat at the Royal Albert Hall.  He played nefarious prison officer Jim Fenner in Bad Girls: The Musical at the Garrick Theatre in London's West End (2007). He toured the UK Antarctic explorer Robert Falcon Scott in G. M. Calhoun's The Last South  (2008).

Other London credits include Anatoly in Chess, Orin Scrivello DDS in Little Shop of Horrors, Captain Harkness in the world premiere musical adaptation of The Far Pavilions, Vic Christian in the Pet Shop Boys' musical Closer to Heaven, and Ernest Hemingway in the musical Beautiful and Damned.  He also appeared in the Royal National Theatre production of Leonard Bernstein's musical Candide.

David Burt created the role of King John in Blondel, by Tim Rice and Stephen Oliver.  He can be heard on the 1985 original London cast recording of Les Misérables, as Enjolras, and the 1996 London cast recording of Jesus Christ Superstar.  He was among the only members of the original principal Les Misérables cast not to appear at the 25th Anniversary concert, claiming he would not be able to sing the part in the encore anymore.

In 2011, he starred as Zangler in Crazy for You at the Novello Theatre, London. Notable hijinks included handing a hard hat to an orchestra member during the bows, after accidentally sending a chair into the pit during Act 2.  In 2014 he appeared alongside Gina Beck, Daniel Boys and Eve Polycarpou in Jacques Brel is Alive and Well and Living in Paris at the Charing Cross Theatre.

In 2016, Burt starred in the world premiere of The Buskers Opera in London.  He is currently appearing in The Last Ones by Maxim Gorky at London's Jermyn Street Theatre.

Credits

Film & TV

West End Credits

Off-West End Credits

National Theatre Credits

Touring & Regional Credits

References

English male stage actors
English male musical theatre actors
1953 births
Living people
Alumni of RADA